Neill Cameron is a British cartoonist.

Biography

Cameron started out in British small press comics, most notably drawing Bulldog Empire, which also appeared in the small press section of Judge Dredd Megazine and was reprinted in the first volume of ILYA's Mammoth Book of Best New Manga. He provided the art for the Classical Comics's award-winning adaptation of Henry V.

Cameron works predominantly in British weekly children's comics, creating Mo-Bot High for The DFC, and his work has appeared regularly in The Phoenix since 2011.

His first webcomic, 2020x365 is created in 2020.

Bibliography

Comics
 Dumbass Comics (collected in Absolute Dumbass)
 Bulldog Empire (written by Jason Cobley, reprinted in Mammoth Book of Best New Manga Vol. 1)
 Beautiful Things (with Sean Michael Wilson, Boychild productions, June 2005):
 "The Unveiling" 
 "Homecoming"
 Henry V (written by John McDonald, with inks by Bambos, 144 pages, November 2007)
 "Japan Manga diary" (in NEO magazine)
 Mo-Bot High in The DFC

Titles published in The Phoenix:

How to Make Awesome Comics (2014, David Fickling Books)
The Pirates of Pangaea (Written by Daniel Hartwell, 2015, David Fickling Books)
Mega Robo Bros
Mega Robo Bros (2016, David Fickling Books)
Mega Robo Rumble (2017, David Fickling Books)
Mega Robo Revenge (2019, David Fickling Books)
Tamsin Series (Illustrated by Kate Brown)
Tamsin and the Deep (2016, David Fickling Books)
Tamsin and the Dark (2018, David Fickling Books)
Tamsin and the Days

Illustration
 "Political Creatures" (promotional art, by Rich Johnston)
 "Crash Course" (with ILYA, Flash game for the BBC)

Awards
 2008: Won the Silver Medal "Graphic Novel/Drawn Book – Drama/Documentary" Independent Publisher Book Award, for Henry V.
2016: Nominated for Young People's Comic Award at the 2016 British Comic Awards for Tamsin and the Deep and Mega Robo Bros.
2017: Winner of the Excelsior Award Jr Mega Robo Bros and shortlisted for Tamsin and the Deep.

Notes

References

2000 AD profile

External links 
 
 Bulldog Empire
 Thump Culture, webcomic
Twitter

Living people
British comics artists
British comics writers
1977 births